Weekapaug Inn is a historic inn at 25 Spray Rock Road in Westerly, Rhode Island.

In 1899, Phebe and Frederick C. Buffum built the original Weekapaug Inn on a strip of land between the Quonochontaug Pond and the Atlantic Ocean in the community of Weekapaug, Rhode Island. It was destroyed by the New England Hurricane of 1938, but they rebuilt it the following year. The new structure was situated across the pond from the original site, and it reopened in 1939.  The Buffum family ran the inn for the next 108 years until it closed for renovations in 2007.  The Weekapaug Inn was added to the National Register of Historic Places in 2007.

See also
National Register of Historic Places listings in Washington County, Rhode Island

External links
 Weekapaug Inn

References

Hotel buildings on the National Register of Historic Places in Rhode Island
Buildings and structures in Washington County, Rhode Island
Hotels in Rhode Island
Hotel buildings completed in 1939
Westerly, Rhode Island
National Register of Historic Places in Washington County, Rhode Island